Edvinas Girdvainis (born 17 January 1993) is a Lithuanian professional footballer who plays as a centre-back.

Club career
On 28 June 2016, Girdvainis signed a three-year contract with one of the top Poland clubs Piast Gliwice. On 21 July 2017, he was loaned for one season to Russian club Tom Tomsk.

On 18 August 2018, Girdvainis signed a one-year contract with Keşla FK.

2020–2021 season he played in 3. Liga club KFC Uerdingen 05.

International career
Girdvainis debuted in the Lithuania national team against Romania on 23 March 2016.

References

External links
 
 

Living people
1993 births
Sportspeople from Klaipėda
Association football defenders
Lithuanian footballers
FK Ekranas players
Marbella FC players
Piast Gliwice players
FC Tom Tomsk players
Hapoel Tel Aviv F.C. players
Shamakhi FK players
FK RFS players
KFC Uerdingen 05 players
Lithuania youth international footballers
Lithuania under-21 international footballers
Lithuania international footballers
Ekstraklasa players
Israeli Premier League players
Azerbaijan Premier League players
Latvian Higher League players
3. Liga players
Lithuanian expatriate footballers
Expatriate footballers in Spain
Lithuanian expatriate sportspeople in Spain
Expatriate footballers in Russia
Lithuanian expatriate sportspeople in Russia
Expatriate footballers in Poland
Lithuanian expatriate sportspeople in Poland
Expatriate footballers in Israel
Lithuanian expatriate sportspeople in Israel
Expatriate footballers in Azerbaijan
Lithuanian expatriate sportspeople in Latvia
Expatriate footballers in Latvia
Lithuanian expatriate sportspeople in Germany
Expatriate footballers in Germany